Panonija is a village in the Bačka Topola municipality, in the North Bačka District of Serbia. It is in the Autonomous Province of Vojvodina. The village has a Serb ethnic majority and at the 2002 census its population was 794.

Name
In Serbian and Croatian the village is known as Panonija (Панонија), in Hungarian as Pannónia. Its name means "Pannonia", and although this name is usually used to designate the ancient Roman province, the modern use of this term also designates the Pannonian plain.

Historical population

1981: 877
1991: 970

References
Slobodan Ćurčić, Broj stanovnika Vojvodine, Novi Sad, 1996.

See also
List of places in Serbia
List of cities, towns and villages in Vojvodina

Places in Bačka